Snezhnogorsk is a town under the administrative jurisdiction of the closed administrative-territorial formation of Alexandrovsk in Murmansk Oblast, Russia. Population:

History
It was founded in 1970 and was granted town status in 1980. It was previously known as Murmansk-60 and Vyuzhny.

Administrative and municipal status
Within the framework of administrative divisions, Snezhnogorsk is subordinated to the closed administrative-territorial formation of Alexandrovsk—an administrative unit with the status equal to that of the districts. Within the framework of municipal divisions, the town of Snezhnogorsk is a part of Alexandrovsk Urban Okrug.

Economy

The town's main employer is the Nerpa shipyard, which services and repairs the nuclear submarines of the Russian Northern Fleet.

References

Notes

Sources
Official website of Murmansk Oblast. Registry of the Administrative-Territorial Structure of Murmansk Oblast

External links
Unofficial website of Snezhnogorsk 

Cities and towns in Murmansk Oblast
Nuclear weapons program of the Soviet Union